Silver Lake or Srebrno Lake is an oxbow lake along the right Danube bank in the Braničevo region in eastern Serbia, near the town of Veliko Gradište. It is a popular tourist resort.

Location 

Geography 

The mouth of the river Pek into the Danube, known by its inverse flow during the high water levels, is just south of the lake. Historical sites of the medieval city-fortresses of Ram and Golubac also in the vicinity of the lake, so as the springs of "Hajdučka voda" (Hajduk's water).

Silver Lake is an arm of the Danube on its right bank. With the main river bed of the Danube it engulfes the marshy ada (river island) of Ostrovo. On both points which connect the lake to the Danube it was dammed and bridged in 1971 by the Veliko Gradište-Zatonje road which also crosses the island. Other settlements on the lake are Biskuplje and Kisiljevo.

The water is clear due to the lack of pollution and the natural filtration of the water through many sand dunes. The lake is abundant in fish, including white amur, common carp (the largest had ), wels catfish, northern pike, perch, zander, grass carp and other freshwater whitefish.

Economy 

The lake has been a popular holiday and fishing destination for decades, but recently experienced visitor's boom, attracting tourists from all over Central Serbia, despite lack of major accommodations. The lake has one hotel (Srebrno jezero), several restaurant-boardinghouses, a weekend-settlement and the largest car camping park in Serbia.

As a result of the lake's growing popularity, it has been since recently advertised as "Serbian sea", since Serbia is landlocked. A major plans for turning Silver Lake from the resort of the middle class into a more elite place were announced in July 2007. In the next seven years it is planned to build three hotels, congressional halls, pools (both opened and covered), golf courses, cycling paths, shopping malls and marina. The tennis courts have been constructed earlier in 2007.

In 2017, the Silver Lake had the tourist capacity of 2,000 beds with 500 being in construction with the deadline in 2018. There are over 50 objects as part of the village tourism, seven villas, but still only one hotel. Basketball player Miloš Teodosić opened his TEO4 Basketball Camp on the lake. Vicinity of the lake is the location of many festivities: the annual Silver Lake Chess Festival, Serbian beach volley championships, "The Days of Carevac" (dedicated to Vlastimir Pavlović Carevac), "Bean Festival", "Fishermen Evenings" (fish soup cooking competition, dating from the 1960s), Silafest (international festival of tourism and environmental film), "The Dusks of Ram" (poetry festival), etc. There were over 50,000 visitors in 2016, including many from the neighboring Romania, who mostly visit by weekends.

By 2020, the small, grassy runway was arranged, but it was deemed insufficient. Regulatory spatial plan was announced in 2020, which includes the proper airport, the first planned touristic airport in Serbia. Locality Beli Bagrem was chosen. Apart from commercial objects, garages, hangars and other typical airport facilities, construction of heliport is also planned. Deadline is set to 3 to 5 years.

At the Veliko Gradište side of the lake, a small, simple pier was built in time, and named Silver Lake Marina. In February 2022, construction of the proper marina with 200-mooring lots, was announced. It will be adapted to receive international cruisers.

See also 
List of lakes in Serbia

References

Sources

External links 
 Silver lake tourist portal
 Srebrno jezero official site
 Srebrno jezero - Kalinovcic

Lakes of Serbia
Danube
Tourist attractions in Serbia
Braničevo District
Oxbow lakes